The Houghton Giants was the moniker of the minor league baseball teams based in Houghton, Michigan. Between 1890 and 1907, Houghton teams played as members of the Upper Peninsula League in 1890 and 1891 and Northern-Copper Country League in 1906 and 1907, winning the 1890 Upper Peninsula League championship. Houghton hosted home minor league games at the East Houghton Grounds and Ripley Sands Park.

History
Houghton, Michigan began minor league play in 1890, hosting the Houghton team in the Independent level Upper Peninsula League. In their first season of play, Houghton won the 1896 championship. Houghton ended the season with a 23-12 record, finishing 4.0 games ahead of the 2nd place Ishpeming team, who were followed by the Marquette Undertakers and Calumet Red Jackets. The Hancock and Negaunee teams both folded before the season had concluded.

In 1891, Houghton placed last in the Upper Peninsula League. With a final record of 27–35, the Houghton team placed 4th in the final standings of the four-team league, finishing 10.0 games behind the 1st place Calumet Red Jackets.

In 1906, the Houghton Giants became charter members of the eight–team Class C level Northern-Copper Country League.

In their first season of play in the new league, the 1906 Houghton Giants placed 2nd in the Northern-Copper Country League. Beginning play on May 17, 1906, the Houghton Giants ended the 1906 season with a record of 56–65, playing under manager Howard Cassiboine. Houghton finished 1.5 games behind the 1st place Calumet Aristocrats (61–37) and ahead of Winnipeg Maroons (57–38), Duluth White Sox (52–44), Lake Linden Sandy Lakes (40–56) and Fargo Trolley Dodgers (35–59) in the final standings. The Hancock Infants (29–34) and Grand Forks Forkers (13–40) teams folded during the season. Houghton pitchers Roy Beecher, Paul Grimes, Harry Bond and Rube Berry each won 18 games to tie for the league lead.

The Houghton Giants played their final season in 1907. The 1907 Northern-Copper Country League played as a four–team Class D level league. Beginning play on May 14, 1907, the Houghton Giants placed 3rd in the 1907 the Northern-Copper Country League standings, when the season ended early on September 2, 1907. Houghton ended the 1907 season with a 47–55 record, playing under managers M.O. Taylor and Pat Flaherty. The Giants finished 25.5 games behind the 1st place Winnipeg Maroons (70–27), 2nd place Duluth White Sox (49–53) and ahead of the 4th place Calumet Aristocrats (34–65) in the final standings.

The Northern-Copper Country League permanently folded after the 1907 season. Houghton, Michigan has not hosted another minor league team.

The ballparks
The Houghton minor league teams of 1890 and 1891 played home games at the East Houghton Grounds. Originally constructed in the 1880's, the East Houghton Grounds were noted to have been located just south of Hubbell Hall, on today's campus of Michigan Technological University, Houghton, Michigan.

The Houghton Giants hosted home minor league games at Ripley Sands Park. With the ballpark being located on Portage Lake, fans gained access to the park by traveling on a passenger steamer.

Timeline

Year–by–year record

Notable alumni

Ed Barry (1906)
Roy Beecher (1906)
Pat Flaherty (1907, MGR)
Frank Miller (1907)
Jerome Utley (1906)
Buzzy Wares (1906)

References

External links
Baseball Reference

Defunct minor league baseball teams
Defunct baseball teams in Michigan
Baseball teams established in 1906
Baseball teams disestablished in 1907
Houghton, Michigan